The United States census of 1930, conducted by the Census Bureau one month from April 1, 1930, determined the resident population of the United States to be 122,775,046, an increase of 13.7 percent over the 106,021,537 persons enumerated during the 1920 census.

Census questions

The 1930 census collected the following information:
 address
 name
 relationship to head of family
 home owned or rented
 if owned, value of home
 if rented, monthly rent
 whether owned a radio set
 whether on a farm
 sex
 race
 age
 marital status and, if married, age at first marriage
 school attendance
 literacy
 birthplace of person, and their parents
 if foreign born:
 language spoken at home before coming to the U. S.
 year of immigration
 whether naturalized
 ability to speak English
 occupation, industry and class of worker
 whether at work previous day (or last regular work day)
 veteran status
 if Indian:
 whether of full or mixed blood
 tribal affiliation

Full documentation for the 1930 census, including census forms and enumerator instructions, is available from  the Integrated Public Use Microdata Series.

Data availability
The original census enumeration sheets were microfilmed by the Census Bureau in 1949, after which the original sheets were destroyed. The microfilmed census is located on 2,667 rolls of microfilm, and available from the National Archives and Records Administration. Several organizations also host images of the microfilmed census online, and digital indices.

Microdata from the 1930 census are freely available through the Integrated Public Use Microdata Series. Aggregate data for small areas, together with electronic boundary files, can be downloaded from the National Historical Geographic Information System.

State rankings

City rankings

Notes

External links

 1930 Census Questions Hosted at CensusFinder.com
 1931 U.S Census Report Contains 1930 census results
 Historic US Census data
 1930Census.com: 1930 United States Census for Genealogy & Family History Research
 1930 Interactive US Census Find stories, photos and more attached to names on the 1930 US census.

United States Census, 1930
United States census
United States